The Hindustan Ghadar (Hindi: हिन्दुस्तान  ग़दर; Punjabi: : ਹਿੰਦੁਸਤਾਨ ਗ਼ਦਰ; Punjabi ,) was a weekly publication that was the party organ of the Ghadar Party. It was published under the auspices of the Yugantar Ashram (Advent of a New Age Ashram) in San Francisco. Its purpose was to further the militant nationalist faction of the Indian independence movement, especially amongst Indian sepoys of the British Indian Army.

In 1912–1913, the Pacific Coast Hindustan Association was formed by Indian immigrants under the leadership of Har Dayal, with Sohan Singh Bhakna as its president, which later came to be called the Ghadar Party. With donations raised with the help of the Indian diaspora, especially with the aid of Indian students at the University of California, Berkeley, the party established the Yugantar Ashram at 436 Hill Street where a printing press was set up with the donations. The first Urdu edition of Hindustan Ghadar appeared on 1 November 1913, followed by a Punjabi edition 9 December 1913.
The issues were first handwritten before being printed on the press. Careful measures were taken to shield the party and its supporters from British intelligence, which included the measure of memorising over a thousand names of the subscribers so that no incriminating evidence could fall into the hands of the British government.

The articles in the paper were initially authored by Har Dayal, with the printing operation run by Kartar Singh Sarabha, then a student of UC Berkeley. Copies of the paper began to be shipped to India with returning Ghadarites and immigrants, and were quickly deemed to be seditious and banned by the British Indian government. Later publications from the Yugantar Ashram included compilations of nationalist compositions and pamphlets, including Ghadar di gunj, Talwar and other publications which were also banned from British India.

References

External links
Echoes of Freedom: South Asian pioneers in California 1899-1965. University of California, Berkeley. Bancroft Library. 
 .
 .
.

Asian-American culture in San Francisco
Ghadar Party
Indian-American culture in California
Literature of Indian independence movement
Newspapers published in San Francisco
Non-English-language newspapers published in California
Pakistani-American culture in California
Punjabi-American culture
Revolutionary movement for Indian independence
Urdu-language newspapers published in the United States
1913 establishments in California
Weekly newspapers published in California